Woodhaven Boulevard and Cross Bay Boulevard (formerly Jamaica Bay Boulevard) are two parts of a major boulevard in the New York City borough of Queens. Woodhaven Boulevard runs roughly north–south in the central portion of Queens. South of Liberty Avenue, it is known as Cross Bay Boulevard, which is the main north–south road in Howard Beach. Cross Bay Boulevard is locally known as simply "Cross Bay", and Woodhaven Boulevard, "Woodhaven". The completion of the boulevard in 1923, together with the construction of the associated bridges over Jamaica Bay, created the first direct roadway connection to the burgeoning Atlantic Ocean beachfront communities of the Rockaway Peninsula from Brooklyn and most of Queens.

The road is part of the New York City Arterial System, having formerly been given the unsigned reference route designation of New York State Route 908V (NY 908V). However, the reference route has not been listed in NYSDOT documents since April 2005, and is maintained by the New York City Department of Transportation. The southernmost  of the route on the Rockaway peninsula, locally known as Cross Bay Parkway, is designated but not signed as New York State Route 907J (NY 907J).

Route description

Beginning at the intersection with Queens Boulevard near the Queens Center shopping mall in Elmhurst, the boulevard runs generally south through the neighborhoods of Rego Park, Elmhurst, Middle Village, Glendale, Woodhaven (for which it is named), and Ozone Park. At the intersection with Liberty Avenue in Ozone Park, the name of the street changes to Cross Bay Boulevard. It continues south through Ozone Park, Howard Beach and across Jamaica Bay via the Joseph P. Addabbo Memorial Bridge through Broad Channel, before finally coming to an end at Rockaway Beach in The Rockaways, after crossing over the Cross Bay Bridge.

Since Cross Bay Boulevard is a direct continuation of Woodhaven Boulevard, it is a large street, although not as wide. It is a six-lane wide, median-divided boulevard throughout the majority of its stretch (although it shrinks to four lanes once it reaches Broad Channel). Cross Bay Boulevard is the only direct connection between the Rockaways, Broad Channel, and the rest of Queens.

Formerly, Woodhaven Boulevard (through Glendale, Woodhaven, and Ozone Park) had up to six central lanes and four service lanes (10 bi-directional), resembling many other major thoroughfares in the New York City boroughs outside Manhattan, such as Queens Boulevard in Queens; Ocean Parkway, Linden Boulevard, Kings Highway, and Eastern Parkway in Brooklyn; and Bruckner Boulevard, Pelham Parkway, and Grand Concourse in the Bronx. However, these service roads were removed in September 2017. It is also the only Queens roadway with its own distinct FIRE LANE markings, similar to those found on Manhattan's north–south avenues.  , Woodhaven Boulevard contains dedicated bus lanes along most of its length, while Cross Bay Boulevard does not.

History

Woodhaven and Cross Bay Boulevards was originally laid out as South Meadow Road in 1668. It originated at the intersection of present-day Queens Boulevard and Grand Avenue, and went as far south as Jamaica Bay. Around the 1850s, South Meadow Road was renamed Trotting Course Lane, after the number of trotting courses and horse racetracks found in Woodhaven, halfway along the road's route. Part of the original Trotting Course Lane still exists near Metropolitan Avenue. In 1889, the road was renamed Flushing Avenue. By the time Queens became part of New York City in 1896, Flushing Avenue had been renamed yet again because the name was shared by another road a few miles away. The road was now named Woodhaven Avenue, after the neighboring community. Shortly afterward, Woodhaven Avenue was straightened in the vicinity of Metropolitan Avenue, resulting in the present-day Trotting Course Lane.

Cross Bay Boulevard dates from Patrick Flynn's 1899 proposal to build a road across Jamaica Bay. Flynn's project aimed at connecting the Jamaica Bay islands, filling in the marshes and leasing properties for homes along the route. The Long Island Rail Road, whose Rockaway Beach Branch trestles were the only transportation connection across the bay at the time, vigorously opposed Flynn's plans in an effort to protect its monopoly. In June 1902, the New York Court of Appeals invalidated the 1892 lease that Flynn's project was based on. The only work that had been performed was a flattening of a plateau south from Liberty Avenue to a point  from the bay's northern shore.

In the late 1910s, plans surfaced again to build Cross Bay Boulevard between Woodhaven and the Rockaways. Advocates stated that the construction of the boulevard would result in development in the Rockaways. In September 1918, the New York City Board of Estimate approved plans for Cross Bay Boulevard. A $2.9 million bid for the boulevard's construction was received in October 1921. The project encountered difficulties, including the presence of oyster beds in the boulevard's path, which had to be removed before construction could proceed. Referred to as Jamaica Bay Boulevard, the southern portion between Broad Channel and Rockaway Beach opened in October 1924, and the entire route up to the existing intersection of Woodhaven Avenue and Liberty Avenue opened a year later in 1925. The new boulevard used much of Flynn's original right-of-way, but the causeway across Jamaica Bay connected to mainland Queens east of the location of Flynn's plateau.

Woodhaven Boulevard's northern end at Queens Boulevard was formerly known as Slattery Plaza, where the two major thruways originally intersected with Eliot Avenue and Horace Harding Boulevard. The intersection, along with the Woodhaven Boulevard subway station, were named after Colonel John R. Slattery, former Transportation Board chief engineer who died in 1932 while supervising the construction of the Independent Subway System's Eighth Avenue Line. The construction of the Long Island Expressway along the Horace Harding corridor caused Slattery Plaza to be demolished.

A 1941 proposal would have created an expressway on the route of Cross Bay and Woodhaven Boulevards, connecting Queens Boulevard to The Rockaways.

Once heavily German and Irish, the area is now very ethnically diverse. The headquarters of the St. Patrick's Day Parade Committee is located on Woodhaven Boulevard (see also Irish Americans in New York City).

The first dedicated MTA bus lanes on the corridor were installed in August 2015, on the north end of Woodhaven Boulevard between Dry Harbor Road and Metropolitan Avenue. In September 2017, the NYCDOT announced that the segment of Woodhaven Boulevard between Union Turnpike and 81st Road would also get dedicated bus lanes for Select Bus Service. As part of that segment's bus lane implementation, the NYCDOT would remove the medians separating service-road and main-road traffic in each direction, as well as expand the median separating the two directions of traffic.

Transportation

Woodhaven Boulevard is served along its entirety by the Q11 and Q21 local bus lines; the Q21 and Q41 also continue down Cross Bay Boulevard from Liberty Avenue to 164th Avenue in Howard Beach, via local streets in Lindenwood. The Q11 runs down Woodhaven and Cross Bay Boulevards to Pitkin Avenue in Ozone Park, and continues through Old Howard Beach or Hamilton Beach. The three local buses run along with the Q52 and Q53, which are Select Bus Service routes. The Q52 and Q53 run down the entire stretch of both Woodhaven and Cross Bay Boulevards to the Rockaway Peninsula; the Q52 terminates in Arverne and the Q53 in Rockaway Park. At Queens Center, the Q11, Q21, and Q52 all terminate; the Q53 continues via Queens Boulevard and Broadway to Woodside, at the 61st Street subway and Woodside LIRR stations. The Q11 and Q21 routes, which originally corresponded to the Woodhaven and Cross Bay portions of the boulevard respectively, date back to 1930s when they were among 54 bus routes approved by the Board of Estimate for operation.

Three subway stations are located on Woodhaven Boulevard: Woodhaven Boulevard (IND Queens Boulevard Line), Woodhaven Boulevard (BMT Jamaica Line), and Rockaway Boulevard (IND Fulton Street Line). The Long Island Expressway is also accessible from Woodhaven Boulevard near Queens Center in Elmhurst.

To the east of the boulevard lies the abandoned Rockaway Beach Branch formerly operated by the Long Island Rail Road, which parallels the boulevard for most of its route between Rego Park and the Rockaways. Both the Rockaway line and the boulevard represent the Woodhaven-Cross Bay Boulevard transit corridor. The rail line north of Liberty Avenue was closed in 1962, replaced by the Q53 which until 2006 ran non-stop between Rego Park and Broad Channel, with the Q11 and Q21 providing local service on the Woodhaven and Cross Bay portions of the route respectively. The entire line has been planned to be converted for subway service going back to the 1920s blueprints of the Independent Subway System (IND); the portion south of Liberty Avenue was converted into the IND Rockaway Line in 1956, while the northern portion remains inactive. Some local mass transit advocates have urged that the northern portion be refurbished and reopened as a faster rail link between Queens and Manhattan. A Select Bus Service bus rapid transit corridor is planned along the corridor, which would attempt to replicate rapid transit service with the current Q52 and Q53 routes. The plan has received mixed reviews, due to the addition of bus-only lanes which could negatively affect traffic flow.

In popular culture
Cross Bay Boulevard was mentioned in The Vaccines' song Nørgaard about Danish model Amanda Nørgaard.

Major intersections

See also

 King of Queens
 List of reference routes in New York

References

External links

 Cross Bay Boulevard in HowardBeach.com 
 Proposed Cross Bay-Woodhaven Expressway @ NYCROADS.com
 Woodhaven House web site, with discussion of history of Irish pubs in Queens
 A Walk Through Queens, PBS Thirteen History of Queens
 History of Woodhaven from Congressman Weiner's web site

Streets in Queens, New York
Transportation in Rockaway, Queens
Robert Moses projects